The Grafton ministry was the British government headed by Augustus FitzRoy, 3rd Duke of Grafton. It served between October 1768 and January 1770.

History
The Grafton ministry arose from the gradual decay of its predecessor, the Chatham ministry, which Grafton had effectively been leading for some time due to the illness and withdrawal from public affairs of its nominal head Lord Chatham. In order to maintain a comfortable parliamentary majority, Grafton had drawn the Bedford Whigs (Earl Gower, Viscount Weymouth, and the Earl of Hillsborough) into the ministry at the end of 1767. Although Grafton himself and many of the previous members of the government (including Chatham) supported a conciliatory policy towards Britain's restless American colonies, the Bedfords favoured stronger, more coercive measures, and the ministry, in spite of Grafton's own views, drifted towards the Bedford position. When this led to an attempt to replace the conciliatory Southern Secretary, Lord Shelburne, Chatham finally roused himself enough to resign from his position as Lord Privy Seal, leaving Grafton as the nominal as well as real head of a ministry in which the Bedford faction was now stronger than ever.

The government was widely criticised for its handling of foreign affairs, particularly for allowing the Republic of Corsica, a British ally, to fall to the French during the Corsican Crisis. It was subject to a series of attacks in what became known as the Junius Letters. With the resignation in January 1770 of Grafton himself, Lord Camden, and Lord Granby, Chatham's remaining adherents in the cabinet, the Grafton ministry was replaced by the North ministry under the Chancellor of the Exchequer, Lord North, which was to last until 1782.

Cabinet
:

Changes
 October 1768 – Lord Weymouth is succeeded by Lord Rochford as Northern Secretary. Lord Shelburne is succeeded by Weymouth as Southern Secretary.
 January 1770 – Lord Camden is succeeded by Charles Yorke as Lord Chancellor. Yorke dies on 20 January and the position is left in commission.

References

 

British ministries
Government
1768 establishments in Great Britain
1770 disestablishments in Great Britain
1760s in Great Britain
1770 in Great Britain
Ministries of George III of the United Kingdom
1770s in Great Britain